Randolph Township may refer to:

Arkansas
 Randolph Township, Desha County, Arkansas, in Desha County, Arkansas

Illinois
 Randolph Township, McLean County, Illinois

Indiana
 Randolph Township, Ohio County, Indiana
 Randolph Township, Tippecanoe County, Indiana

Minnesota
 Randolph Township, Dakota County, Minnesota

Missouri
 Randolph Township, St. Francois County, Missouri

New Jersey
 Randolph Township, New Jersey

North Dakota
 Randolph Township, McKenzie County, North Dakota, in McKenzie County, North Dakota

Ohio
 Randolph Township, Montgomery County, Ohio, now part of the city of Clayton
 Randolph Township, Portage County, Ohio

Pennsylvania
 Randolph Township, Crawford County, Pennsylvania

Township name disambiguation pages